"Oleanna" (or "Oleana") is a Norwegian folk song that was translated into English and popularized by former Weavers member Pete Seeger. The song is a critique of Ole Bull's vision of a perfect society in America. Oleanna was actually the name of one of Ole Bull's settlements in the New Norway colony of Pennsylvania. His society failed, and all of the immigrants moved away since the dense forest made it hard to settle there. The lyrics concern the singer's desire to leave Norway and escape to Oleanna, a land where "wheat and corn just plant themselves, then grow a good four feet a day while on your bed you rest yourself."

The lyrics for Oleanna were written by Ditmar Meidell, a Norwegian magazine editor who set his words to the melody "Rio Janeiro". The song was first published on March 5, 1853, in Krydseren (The Cruiser), a satirical magazine which Meidell had founded.

In English

Theodore C. Blegen included the song in his 1936 book Norwegian Emigrant Songs and Ballads, which had the original lyrics, a literal translation by Martin B. Ruud and musical notation. Eight years later Blegen himself wrote a singable translation consisting of 22 verses. Folksinger Pete Seeger learned Oleanna from Blegen's book and in 1955 wrote a six-verse translation that was later published in Sing Out! magazine.

In 1960 Theodore Bikel and Alan Lomax each published versions of Oleanna that drew on Seeger's translation, Meidell's original lyrics and their own imaginations. Jerry Silverman translated 19 of the 22 verses in 1992.

Seeger recorded Oleanna twice for Folkways Records. Among those who also covered his translation were Theodore Bikel, Joe Glazer and the Gateway Singers. The Kingston Trio, however, released a version with lyrics unrelated to Meidell's original text. English and Norwegian recordings of the song can be found at video-sharing websites, online retailers and digital download services.

References

External links
Ole Bull statue in Minneapolis by Jacob Fjelde  
Lyrics
Oleana lyrics in Norwegian 
1944 translation of Oleana by Theodore C. Blegen
1955 translation of Oleanna by Pete Seeger Click on "Download Liner Notes".
Videos
Pete Seeger and Lillebjørn Nilsen
The Kingston Trio 
Ole Bull State Park
Ole Bull's Colony at ExplorePAhistory
2002 Ole Bull monument at Ole Bull State Park

1853 songs
Norwegian folk songs
Norwegian migration to North America
World music songs
Songs about Norway
Songs about Pennsylvania
Protest songs
Songs about musicians
Cultural depictions of Norwegian men